Vasudha is a 1992 Indian Malayalam film, directed by U. V. Babu and produced by SNM Pictures. The film stars Innocent, Rekha, Rajan P. Dev and Maniyanpilla Raju in the lead roles. The film has musical score by Perumbavoor G. Raveendranath.

Cast
 

Innocent 

Geeta Nair 
Rekha 
Rajan P. Dev 
Maniyanpilla Raju 
Charuhasan 
Kakka Ravi 
Kanaka 
Sai Kumar 
Silk Smitha

Soundtrack
The music was composed by Perumbavoor G. Raveendranath.

References

External links
 

1992 films
1990s Malayalam-language films
Films scored by Perumbavoor G. Raveendranath